Władysław Szuszkiewicz (12 November 1938 in Wilno – 14 November 2007) was a Polish sprint canoer who competed from the mid-1960s to the early 1970s. Competing in three Summer Olympics, he won a bronze medal in the K-2 1000 m event at Munich in 1972.

Szuszkiewicz's wife, the former Izabella Antonowicz, also competed as a sprint canoer during the 1960s and 1970s.

References
  Profile at Polish Olympic Committee website
 Sports-reference.com profile

1938 births
2007 deaths
Canoeists at the 1964 Summer Olympics
Canoeists at the 1968 Summer Olympics
Canoeists at the 1972 Summer Olympics
Olympic canoeists of Poland
Olympic bronze medalists for Poland
Polish male canoeists
Sportspeople from Vilnius
People from Wilno Voivodeship (1926–1939)
Olympic medalists in canoeing
Medalists at the 1972 Summer Olympics